Virginie Razzano (born 12 May 1983) is a former French professional tennis player. She won two WTA Tour singles titles, both of them in 2007. Razzano reached her career-high WTA singles ranking of world No. 16 on 14 September 2009. She represented France in the Fed Cup from 2001 to 2014; her overall Fed Cup win–loss record is 16–9 (singles 10–5, doubles 6–4).

Career

2005
She was chosen by Georges Goven to play in the Fed Cup first round when Tatiana Golovin had an injury and when Marion Bartoli and Émilie Loit were suspended. However, she was replaced by Séverine Brémond Beltrame because of injury in the quarterfinals.

2006–2007
On 31 August 2006, Razzano upset eighth seed Martina Hingis in the second round of the US Open. On 2 January 2007, she defeated former world No. 5 Daniela Hantuchová in two sets in the second round at the ASB Classic tournament in Auckland. In the first round at Wimbledon, she was upset by unseeded Yvonne Meusburger. At Forest Hills, she lost in her second WTA Tour final to Gisela Dulko.

On 30 September 2007, Razzano won her first singles title in Guangzhou. As the No. 2 seed, she defeated first-time finalist, 34-year-old Israeli Tzipora Obziler, to claim the title and become the 2007 Guangzhou International Women's Open champion. A week later, she claimed her second career title, also in Asia, beating former No. 1 Venus Williams in three sets at the Japan Open Tennis Championships in Tokyo.

2008
On 8 January, Razzano lost to Ana Ivanovic in the first round of the Sydney Medibank International in three sets. In the third set, Razzano was ahead 5–2, only to see Ivanovic win the next five games, and eventually proceed to the semifinals.

In August, she was a member of the French team that competed at the Beijing Olympics.

2009

In her first match of the year, Razzano was defeated by Barbora Záhlavová-Strýcová in the first round in Auckland. At the Moorilla Hobart International, Razzano reached the semifinal where she lost to Petra Kvitová. Ranked fifty-six at the Australian Open, Razzano beat Jarmila Gajdošová and fourteenth seeded Patty Schnyder en route to the third round, where she lost to eighteenth seed Dominika Cibulková.

Razzano fell in the first round of the Open GDF Suez to Anastasia Pavlyuchenkova. However, she rebounded at the Dubai Tennis Championships. She advanced to the final after victories over Kateryna Bondarenko, second seed Dinara Safina, Daniela Hantuchová, fifth seed Vera Zvonareva, and sixteenth seed Kaia Kanepi. She was defeated in the final by sixth seed Venus Williams.

In March, Razzano competed at the BNP Paribas Open in Indian Wells. After beating Evgeniya Rodina in her first-round match, she was forced to retire during her second-round match against eighteenth seed Kaia Kanepi due to a back injury. Razzano fell in the first round of the Sony Ericsson Open to qualifier Julia Görges.

At Ponte Vedra Beach, Razzano defeated Akgul Amanmuradova in the first round, but lost in the second round to second seed and eventual champion Caroline Wozniacki. Razzano reached the quarterfinals of Charleston as the 13th seed, but lost again to Wozniacki, again in straight sets. She was defeated in the second round of the Internazionali BNL d'Italia by world No. 1 and eventual champion Dinara Safina. She lost to Elena Vesnina in the second round of Madrid.

At the French Open, Razzano was unseeded and defeated former world No. 5 Daniela Hantuchová in the first round. She then thrashed 18th seed Anabel Medina Garrigues in two sets, in the second round and beat Tathiana Garbin in the third round in two tight sets. She lost in the fourth round to 30th seed Samantha Stosur. As a result of these wins, Razzano's ranking improved to world No. 26.

After withdrawing from a tournament in Birmingham with a lower back injury, Razzano entered the tournament in Eastbourne, where she was unseeded. She defeated fellow Frenchwoman Alizé Cornet in the first round. She then beat the top seed and world No. 4 Elena Dementieva, winning the decisive third-set tiebreak. She followed this win up with a win over eighth seed and defending champion Agnieszka Radwańska in the quarterfinals. In the semifinals, she was up 6–4, 1–0 when Marion Bartoli was forced to retire with a right quad strain. She lost in the final to sixth seed Caroline Wozniacki. However, Razzano's ranking improved to world No. 23.

At Wimbledon, Razzano was seeded 26th. In the first round, her opponent Tamira Paszek retired after falling behind 6–0, 3–1. After a win over Jill Craybas in the second round, her third-round opponent Vera Zvonareva withdrew to allow Razzano to her first Wimbledon fourth round. Razzano then fell, 2–6, 6–7, to Francesca Schiavone in the fourth round. Despite this loss, Razzano reached a new career-high ranking of world No. 17.

Razzano started her US Open Series campaign in Los Angeles, where she was seeded 11th. She lost in the first round to Anna Chakvetadze. She was seeded 16th at Cincinnati, but also lost in the first round to Anna-Lena Grönefeld. Razzano played her last tournament before the US Open in New Haven. Unseeded in singles, she defeated world No. 20 Patty Schnyder in three sets, in the first round. Fifth seed Agnieszka Radwańska had to retire due to injury in the second round with the score at one set all. Razzano was defeated by Caroline Wozniacki in the quarterfinals. Razzano was seeded 16th at the US Open, but suffered a surprise defeat in the first round to eventual semifinalist Yanina Wickmayer.

Razzano continued her disappointing end to the season in Tokyo as the 16th seed, losing to Iveta Benešová, in the first round. She was forced to pull out of the China Open due to a left calf strain. This turned out to be the end of Razzano's season. She finished her best season on tour ranked world No. 19.

2010
Razzano started her 2010 campaign at the ASB Classic, where she was seeded fifth. She defeated Monica Niculescu in the first round, but she lost in the second round to Kimiko Date-Krumm. She also fell 3–6, 0–6 to Daniela Hantuchová in the first round in Sydney. Razzano was seeded 18th at the Australian Open, but suffered another surprise defeat in the first round to Ekaterina Makarova. This caused her to fall out of the top 20 in the world rankings. Another first-round defeat followed in Paris, where she lost to Patty Schnyder. Razzano continued her season in Dubai where, as an unseeded player, she defeated Selima Sfar in the first round, before losing to world No. 22 and in-form Shahar Pe'er, in the second round. Due to her not defending her points from reaching the final the previous year, Razzano saw a huge change in her ranking as it fell to world No. 39. Razzano next competed at the BNP Paribas Open in Indian Wells, where she defeated Kristina Barrois, in the second round, before losing to 32nd seed Maria Kirilenko in the third round. At the US Open, she beat Klara Zakopalova and upset 13th seed Marion Bartoli, before losing to former No. 1 Ana Ivanovic in the third round.

2011
Razzano started off the year losing in the second qualifying round to Vania King at the Brisbane International.

Prior to the French Open's start, Razzano's fiancé and former coach Stephane Vidal died of a brain tumor. She elected to play despite her loss, knowing that Vidal encouraged her to participate at Roland Garros. She met 24th-seeded Jarmila Gajdošová in the first round, but lost with a score of 3–6, 1–6.

2012
At the French Open, Razzano handed the No. 5 seed Serena Williams her first-ever singles first-round defeat in a Grand Slam tournament. Razzano came back from a set and 1–5 down in the second-set tie-break to emerge victorious in three sets. At the time, Razzano was ranked 106 places lower than Williams, who was the favourite for the title entering the tournament. She was up 5–0 in the final set at one point and needed eight match points to close out the match. She lost to Arantxa Rus in the second round in straight sets.

2016

Razzano began the season at the Brisbane International. She lost in the first round of qualifying to Kaia Kanepi.

In May, Razzano reached the singles semifinals of the Internationaux de Strasbourg for the second consecutive year. She lost her semifinal match narrowly to Caroline Garcia. Three Frenchwomen - Razzano, Garcia and Kristina Mladenovic - reached the semifinals of that tournament. The last time three Frenchwomen made it this far at a WTA tournament was in 2006, when Tatiana Golovin, Mary Pierce and Amélie Mauresmo advanced to the semifinals of 
the  Open Gaz de France, with Mauresmo eventually winning the singles title.

Grand Slam performance timelines

Singles

Doubles

WTA career finals

Singles: 6 (2 titles, 4 runner-ups)

Doubles: 1 title

Notes

References

External links
 
 
 
 
 
 

1983 births
Australian Open (tennis) junior champions
French female tennis players
French Open junior champions
French people of Italian descent
Hopman Cup competitors
Living people
Olympic tennis players of France
Sportspeople from Dijon
Tennis players at the 2008 Summer Olympics
Grand Slam (tennis) champions in girls' singles
Grand Slam (tennis) champions in girls' doubles